Niklas Bachsleitner (born 3 May 1996) is a German Ski cross skier. He competed in the 2022 Winter Olympics.

Career
He made his World Championships debut in 2021 finishing sixth in ski cross. In 21 World Cup starts, his first and only podium finish is third in 2021 Idre Fjall. He currently resides in Grainau. Outside of his athletics career, he is also a soldier.

References

External links

1996 births
Living people
Freestyle skiers at the 2022 Winter Olympics
German male freestyle skiers
Olympic freestyle skiers of Germany
Sportspeople from Garmisch-Partenkirchen
21st-century German people